The Azores Senior Open was a men's senior (over 50) professional golf tournament on the European Seniors Tour, held at the Batalha Golf Course in Ponta Delgada on São Miguel Island in the Azores. It was held just once, in March 2008, and was won by Stewart Ginn who finished two shots ahead of Nick Job. The total prize fund was €325,000 with the winner receiving €48,750.

Winners

References

External links
Coverage on the European Senior Tour's official site

Former European Senior Tour events
Golf tournaments in Portugal
Sport in the Azores